Syed Murad Ali Shah  is a Pakistani politician who was a Member of the Provincial Assembly of Sindh, from May 2013 to May 2018.

Early life and education

He was born on 24 July 1938 in Naushahro Feroze District.

He has a degree of Bachelor of Arts from Sindh University.

Political career

He was elected to the Provincial Assembly of Sindh as a candidate of Pakistan Peoples Party (PPP) from Constituency PS-20 NAUSHERO FEROZE-II in 2013 Pakistani general election.

He was re-elected to Provincial Assembly of Sindh as a candidate of PPP from Constituency PS-34 (Naushahro Feroze-II) in 2018 Pakistani general election.

References

Living people
Sindh MPAs 2013–2018
1938 births
Pakistan People's Party MPAs (Sindh)
Sindh MPAs 2018–2023